Belica (earlier Belicza) is a village and municipality in Međimurje County, the northernmost county of Croatia. The municipality seat is in the village of Belica, located around 5 kilometres east of Čakovec, the largest city of Međimurje County.

According to the 2011 census, the Belica municipality had a total population of 3,176 living in the two villages that the municipality consists of:
Belica (population 2,278)
Gardinovec (population 898)

A total of 3,134 people living in the municipality (or 98.68 percent) identified themselves as Croats during the 2011 census.

The municipality is known for its agriculture, especially potato farming. There is even a monument dedicated to potato in Belica, unveiled in August 2007.

There is also a kart circuit between Belica and the nearby village of Pribislavec, as well as a small sports airfield. Both Belica and Gardinovec have their own football clubs, NK BSK Belica and NK Radnički Gardinovec, who compete in local amateur leagues.

References

External links
Official website 

Municipalities of Croatia
Populated places in Međimurje County